2008 Monaco GP2 Series round was a GP2 Series motor race held on 23 and 24 May 2008 at the Circuit de Monaco in Monte Carlo, Monaco. It was the third race of the 2008 GP2 Series. The race was used to support the 2008 Monaco Grand Prix.

Classification

Qualifying

Feature race

Sprint race

References

Monaco Gp2 Round, 2008
Monaco
Motorsport in Monaco